Rokahurihia Hurihia Ngarimu-Cameron  is a New Zealand Māori  .

Biography 
In 1990, Ngarimu-Cameron established ‘Te Whānau Arohanui’, a marae and foster care centre in Waitati, Otago. The centre provides care for youth and is also a venue for Ngarimu-Cameron's weaving courses.

In 2008 she completed a Master of Fine Arts degree at Otago Polytechnic. Her dissertation studied the combination of traditional Māori weaving and loom weaving, and included a solo exhibition, ‘Toku Haerenga/My Journey’, held at the Dunedin Public Art Gallery. Since 2008 Ngarimu-Cameron has been a lecturer in traditional arts at the University of Otago.

In the 2011 Queen's Birthday Honours, Ngarimu-Cameron was appointed a Member of the New Zealand Order of Merit, for services to Māori.

Ngarimu-Cameron is of the Te Whānau-ā-Apanui, Te Arawa, Whakatōhea, Ngāti Awa and Ngāti Tūwharetoa iwi, and is also of Irish descent.

Publications 

 Ngarimu-Cameron, R. (2010). Tōku haerenga - a transformation of Māori cloaks: Combining traditional Māori materials with western weaving techniques.
Ngarimu-Cameron, R., Torr, J., & Pataka Porirua Museum of Arts and Cultures. (2010). Ngā kākahu: Change & exchange. Porirua [N.Z].: Pataka Museum of Arts & Cultures.
Roka Hurihia Ngarimu-Cameron (MNZM) (2019) Weaving the Two Cultures of Aotearoa/New Zealand Together: From the Art of Making Traditional Off-Loom Garments to a Contemporary Practice of On-Loom Weaving, TEXTILE, 17:2, 158–167, DOI: 10.1080/14759756.2018.1474000

References

Living people
New Zealand Māori weavers
Members of the New Zealand Order of Merit
Ngāti Awa people
Academic staff of the University of Otago
New Zealand women academics
Otago Polytechnic alumni
Te Whānau-ā-Apanui people
Te Arawa people
Whakatōhea people
Ngāti Tūwharetoa people
New Zealand people of Irish descent
Year of birth missing (living people)
University of Otago alumni